Dawn Society may refer to:

 Dawn (Bengali educational society), formed in 1902 in Bengal to promote education and understanding of Indian heritage, achievements, culture and philosophies
 Reimeikai , a Japanese educational society formed in Japan's Taishō period
 Wabunowin, a distinct Anishinaabe society of visionaries primarily in the Great Lakes region of the United States and Canada